The Mackenzie hotspot was a volcanic hotspot that existed about 1.3 billion years ago across Canada from the Northwest Territories and Nunavut. It was centred on what is now Darnley Bay on southwestern Victoria Island.

Extent 
The Mackenzie hotspot is responsible for the creation of the Mackenzie Large Igneous Province, which contains the largest dike swarm on Earth. During its formation, eruption of plateau lavas near the Coppermine River, built an extensive volcanic plateau about 1,200 million years ago with an area of about  representing a volume of lavas of at least .

The Mackenzie hotspot also resulted in the opening of the Mesoproterozoic Poseidon Ocean.

See also
Volcanism of Canada
Volcanism of Northern Canada

References

Volcanism of Nunavut
Volcanism of the Northwest Territories
Mesoproterozoic volcanism
Hotspots of North America